Dimitrios Tasioulis (born 19 February 1997) is a Greek professional footballer who plays as a left winger for Iraklis Larissa.

References

1997 births
Living people
Greek footballers
Association football midfielders
Gamma Ethniki players
Super League Greece players
Football League (Greece) players
Super League Greece 2 players
Tyrnavos 2005 F.C. players
Olympiacos F.C. players
PGS Kissamikos players
Asteras Vlachioti F.C. players
Apollon Larissa F.C. players
O.F. Ierapetra F.C. players
Footballers from Thessaly
People from Larissa (regional unit)